The Prix Thérouanne is an annual prize for history writing awarded by the Académie française from 1869 to 1989.

References

Académie Française awards